Sumida may refer to:

Sumida, Tokyo, one of the 23 special wards of Tokyo, Japan
Sumida River, which flows through Tokyo, Japan
Sumida (surname), a Japanese surname
Japanese gunboat Sumida (1903), a Japanese gunboat launched in 1903 and stricken in 1935
Japanese gunboat Sumida (1939), a Japanese gunboat launched in 1939 and ceded to China as a war prize at the end of World War II
Sumida, a series of Japanese cars manufactured from 1933-1937 by Jidosha Kogyo Co., Ltd. (later to become Isuzu)
1090 Sumida, a minor planet orbiting the Sun